Dale Alan Drozd (born January 21, 1955) is a United States district judge of the United States District Court for the Eastern District of California and former Chief United States Magistrate Judge of the same court.

Early life and education

Drozd was born January 21, 1955, in Los Angeles County, California, and is a 1973 graduate of Servite High School, in Anaheim. He attended the University of Southern California from 1973 to 1975, graduated from San Diego State University with a Bachelor of Arts degree in 1977, and he received a Juris Doctor in 1980 from the University of California, Los Angeles, School of Law.

Professional career 

After graduation Drozd served as a law clerk to the Lawrence K. Karlton, United States District Judge Eastern District of California from 1980 to 1982 and was in private practice of law for 15 years in San Francisco and Sacramento.

Federal judicial service 

The judges of the United States District Court of the Eastern District of California appointed Drozd to be a United States magistrate judge in 1997 and he was appointed as Chief United States Magistrate Judge of the same court in 2010. He served as chief judge from January 1, 2011, until his appointment as district judge.

On November 12, 2014, President Obama nominated Drozd to serve as a judge on the United States District Court for the Eastern District of California, to the seat vacated by Anthony W. Ishii, who assumed senior status on October 31, 2012. On December 16, 2014, his nomination was returned to the president due to the sine die adjournment of the 113th Congress.

On January 7, 2015, President Obama renominated him to the same position. He received a hearing before the United States Senate Judiciary Committee on May 6, 2015. On June 4, 2015, his nomination was reported out of committee by voice vote with Senator Vitter recorded as voting no. On October 5, 2015, the United States Senate voted to confirm him by a 69–21 vote. He received his judicial commission on November 2, 2015.

References

External links

1955 births
Living people
Judges of the United States District Court for the Eastern District of California
United States district court judges appointed by Barack Obama
San Diego State University alumni
Servite High School alumni
United States magistrate judges
UCLA School of Law alumni
University of Southern California alumni
21st-century American judges